Chetthathirat or Borommaracha II (1613 – 1629) was the eldest son of King Song Tham and older brother of Athittayawong and Phra Sisin or Phra Phanpi Sisin, all three of the House of Sukhothai. In childhood he was known as Chetthakuman (พระเชษฐากุมาร), meaning 'Chettha the Infant', or simply Chettha.

Reign
Chetthathirat reigned for around a year according to Songtham's wishes conveyed to Okya Sri Vorawong or Phraya Siworawong – an influential royal page. The events were detailed by Jeremias van Vliet.

This proposed succession was objected to by some leaders in the kingdom, including the military minister,  Samuha Kalahom Chao Phraya Maha Sena. Siworawong gained supporters in the government, and even used the services of Yamada Nagamasa the Okya Senaphimuk. Upon king Songtham’s death, Chetthathirat took the throne and Siworawong arrested and executed those who had opposed the idea. The new king made Siworawong military minister, as Okya Kalahom Siworawong or Chaophraya Kalahom.

Siworawong then induced Phra Sisin, who had entered the priesthood, to come to the palace with his followers.  Siworawong captured him and ordered his execution. However, Chetthathirat spared his life but exiled him to Phetchaburi.  Later Chetthathirat did execute Phra Sisin, when he plotted rebellion.

Death
Upon the death of Siworawong's mother, Siworawong held a grand cremation ceremony over several days, attended by every government servant.  This jealously infuriated the king who was attempting to conduct government business, and punished those servants. Siworawong sought to protect those servants and they vowed their support in opposing the monarch.  They attacked the palace, captured the king and executed him. The throne was given to his younger brother Phra Athittayawong.

Ancestry

References

1613 births
1629 deaths
Sukhothai dynasty
Kings of Ayutthaya
17th-century monarchs in Asia
Executed Thai monarchs
Thai male Chao Fa
Princes of Ayutthaya
Executed children
17th-century Thai people